The perpendicular axis theorem (or plane figure theorem) states that the moment of inertia of a planar lamina (i.e. 2-D body) about an axis perpendicular to the plane of the lamina is equal to the sum of the moments of inertia of the lamina about the two axes at right angles to each other, in its own plane intersecting each other at the point where the perpendicular axis passes through it. 

Let Ix, Iy and Iz be moments of inertia about axis x, y, z respectively. Then the perpendicular axis theorem states that

This rule can be applied with the parallel axis theorem and the stretch rule to find polar moments of inertia for a variety of shapes.

then the perpendicular axes theorem provides the useful relationship:

Derivation 
Working in Cartesian coordinates, the moment of inertia of the planar body about the  axis is given by:

The converse of this theorem is also derived similarly.

References

See also
 Parallel axis theorem
 Stretch rule

Rigid bodies
Physics theorems
Articles containing proofs
Classical mechanics
Moment (physics)